Conjoined twins – popularly referred to as Siamese twins – are twins joined in utero. It is a very rare phenomenon, estimated to occur in anywhere between one in 49,000 births to one in 189,000 births, with a somewhat higher incidence in Southwest Asia and Africa. Approximately half are stillborn, and an additional one-third die within 24 hours. Most live births are female, with a ratio of 3:1.

Two possible explanations of the cause of conjoined twins have been proposed. The one that is  generally accepted is fission, in which the fertilized egg splits partially. The other explanation, no longer believed to be accurate, is fusion, in which the fertilized egg completely separates, but stem cells (that search for similar cells) find similar stem cells on the other twin and fuse the twins together. Conjoined twins share a single common chorion, placenta, and amniotic sac in utero, but so do some monozygotic but non-conjoined twins.

Chang and Eng Bunker (1811–1874) were brothers born in Siam (now Thailand) who traveled widely for many years and were known internationally as the Siamese Twins. Chang and Eng were joined at the torso by a band of flesh and cartilage, and by their fused livers. In modern times, they could easily have been separated. Due to the brothers' fame and the rarity of the condition, the term Siamese twins came to be associated with conjoined twins.

Causes 
There are two theories about the development of conjoined twins. The first is that a single fertilized egg does not fully split during the process of forming identical twins. If the zygote division occurs after two weeks of the development of the embryonic disc, it results in the formation of conjoined twins. The second theory is that a fusion of two fertilized eggs occurs earlier in development.

Partial splitting of the primitive node and streak may result in the formation of conjoined twins. These twins are classified according to the nature and degree of their union. Occasionally, monozygotic twins are connected only by a common skin bridge or by a common liver bridge. The type of twins formed depends on when and to what extent abnormalities of the node and streak occurred. Misexpression of genes, such as Goosecoid, may also result in conjoined twins. Goosecoid activates inhibitors of BMP4 and contributes to regulation of head development. Over- or underexpression of this gene in laboratory animals results in severe malformations of the head region, including duplications, similar to some types of conjoined twins.

Types 
Conjoined twins are typically classified by the point at which their bodies are joined. The most common types of conjoined twins are:
 Thoraco-omphalopagus (28% of cases): Two bodies fused from the upper chest to the lower chest. These twins usually share a heart and may also share the liver or part of the digestive system.
 Thoracopagus (18.5%): Two bodies fused from the upper chest to lower belly. The heart is always shared in these cases. , twins who share a heart have not been able to both survive separation; a designated twin who is allotted the heart may survive if the other twin is sacrificed.
 Omphalopagus (10%): Two bodies fused at the lower abdomen. Unlike thoracopagus, the heart is not shared; however, the twins often share a liver, a digestive system, a diaphragm and other organs.
 Parasitic twins (10%): Twins that are asymmetrically conjoined, resulting in one twin that is small, less formed, and dependent on the larger twin's organs for survival.
 Craniopagus (6%): Fused skulls, but separate bodies. These twins’ heads may be conjoined at the back, front, or side of the head, but not on the face or at the base of the skull.

Other, less common types of conjoined twins include:
 Cephalopagus: Two faces on opposite sides of a single, conjoined head; the upper portion of the body is fused while the bottom portions are separate. These twins generally cannot survive due to severe malformations of the brain. This is also known as janiceps (after the two-faced Roman deity Janus).
 Syncephalus: One head with a single face but four ears and two bodies.
 Cephalothoracopagus: Bodies fused at the head and thorax, with two faces facing in opposite directions, or sometimes with a single face and an enlarged skull.
 Xiphopagus: Two bodies fused in the xiphoid cartilage, which extends approximately from the navel to the lower breastbone. These twins almost never share any vital organs, with the exception of the liver. A famous example is Chang and Eng Bunker.
 Ischiopagus: Fused lower half of the two bodies, with spines conjoined end-to-end at a 180° angle. These twins have four arms; one, two, three or four legs; and typically one set of external genitalia and one anus.
 Omphalo-Ischiopagus: Fused in a similar fashion to ischiopagus twins, but facing each other, with a joined abdomen, akin to omphalopagus. These twins have four arms, and two, three, or four legs.
 Parapagus: Fused side by side with a shared pelvis. Those that are dithoracic parapagus are fused at the abdomen and pelvis, but not at the thorax. Those that are diprosopic parapagus have one trunk and two faces. Those that are dicephalic parapagus have one trunk and two heads, and may have two (dibrachius), three (tribrachius), or four (tetrabrachius) arms.
 Craniopagus parasiticus: Like craniopagus, but with a second bodiless head attached to the dominant head.
 Pygopagus or Iliopagus: Two bodies joined at the pelvis.
 Rachipagus: Twins joined along the back of their bodies, with fusion of the vertebral arches and the soft tissue from the head to the buttocks
 Tricephalus (conjoined triplets): Extremely rare conjoining of 3 fetuses. Very few confirmed cases, both human and animal, are known.

Management

Separation
Surgery to separate conjoined twins may range from very easy to very difficult depending on the point of attachment and the internal parts that are shared. Due to the complex nature of these cases, some medical organizations such as the Children's Hospital of Philadelphia (US, Pennsylvania) have assembled multidisciplinary medical teams that specialize in conjoined twins. Most cases of separation are extremely risky and life-threatening. Though there have been a number of successful separations throughout history, in many cases, the surgery results in the death of one or both of the twins, particularly if they are joined at the head or share a vital organ. This makes the ethics of surgical separation, where the twins can survive if not separated, contentious. Alice Dreger of Northwestern University found the quality of life of twins who remain conjoined to be higher than is commonly supposed. Lori and George Schappell and Abby and Brittany Hensel are notable examples.

The first recorded separation of conjoined twins took place in the Byzantine Empire in the 900s. One of the conjoined twins had already died, so the doctors of the town attempted to separate the dead twin from the surviving twin. The result was briefly successful, as the remaining twin lived for three days after separation. The next recorded case of separating conjoined twins was several centuries later, in Germany, in 1689. The first recorded successful separation of conjoined twins was performed in 1689 by Johannes Fatio. In 1955, neurosurgeon Harold Voris (1902-1980) and his team at Mercy Hospital in Chicago performed the first successful operation to separate craniopagus twins (conjoined at the head), which resulted in long-term survival for both. The larger girl was reported in 1963 as developing normally, but the smaller girl was permanently impaired.

In 1957, Bertram Katz and his surgical team made international medical history performing the world's first successful separation of conjoined twins sharing a vital organ. Omphalopagus twins John Nelson and James Edward Freeman (Johnny and Jimmy) were born in Youngstown, Ohio, on April 27, 1956. The boys shared a liver but had separate hearts and were successfully separated at North Side Hospital in Youngstown, Ohio, by Bertram Katz. The operation was funded by the Ohio Crippled Children's Service Society.

Recent successful separations of conjoined twins include that of the separation of Ganga and Jamuna Shreshta in 2001, who were born in Kathmandu, Nepal, in 2000. The 97-hour surgery on the pair of craniopagus twins was a landmark one which took place in Singapore; the team was led by neurosurgeons Chumpon Chan and Keith Goh. The surgery left Ganga with brain damage and Jamuna unable to walk. Seven years later, Ganga Shrestha died at the Model Hospital in Kathmandu in July 2009, at the age of eight, three days after being admitted for treatment of a severe chest infection.

Infants Rose and Grace Attard, conjoined twins from Malta, were separated in the United Kingdom by court order Re A over the religious objections of their parents, Michaelangelo and Rina Attard. The twins were attached at the lower abdomen and spine. The surgery took place in November 2000, at St Mary's Hospital in Manchester. The operation was controversial because Rose, the weaker twin, would die as a result of the procedure as her heart and lungs were dependent upon Grace's. However, if the operation had not taken place, it was certain that both twins would die. Grace survived to enjoy a normal childhood.

In 2003, two 29-year-old women from Iran, Ladan and Laleh Bijani, who were joined at the head but had separate brains (craniopagus) were surgically separated in Singapore, despite surgeons' warnings that the operation could be fatal to one or both. Their complex case was accepted only because technologically advanced graphical imagery and modeling would allow the medical team to plan the risky surgery. However, an undetected major vein hidden from the scans was discovered during the operation. The separation was completed but both women died while still in surgery.

In 2019 Safa and Marwa Ullah were separated at Great Ormond Street Hospital in London, England. The twins, born January 2017 were joined at the top of the head with separate brains and a cylindrical shared skull with the twins each facing in opposite directions to one another. The surgery was jointly led by neurosurgeon Owase Jeelani and plastic surgeon Professor David Dunaway. The surgery presented particular difficulties due to a number of shared veins and a distortion in the shape of the girls' brains, causing them to overlap. The distortion would need to be corrected in order for the separation to go ahead. The surgery utilized a team of more than 100 including bio engineers, 3D modelers and a virtual reality designer. The separation was completed in February 2019 following a total of 52 hours of surgery over three separate operations. As of July 2019, both girls remain healthy and the family planned to return to their home in Pakistan in 2020.

History 

The Moche culture of ancient Peru depicted conjoined twins in their ceramics dating back to 300 CE. Writing around 415 CE, St. Augustine of Hippo, in his book, City of God, refers to a man "double in his upper, but single in his lower half—having two heads, two chests, four hands, but one body and two feet like an ordinary man."

According to Theophanes the Confessor, a Byzantine historian of the 9th century, around 385/386 CE, "in the village of Emmaus in Palestine, a child was born perfectly normal below the navel but divided above it, so that it had two chests and two heads, each possessing the senses. One would eat and drink but the other did not eat; one would sleep but the other stayed awake. There were times when they played with each other, when both cried and hit each other. They lived for a little over two years. One died while the other lived for another four days and it, too, died."

In Arabia, the twin brothers Hashim ibn Abd Manaf and 'Abd Shams were born with Hashim's leg attached to his twin brother's head. Legend says that their father, Abd Manaf ibn Qusai, separated his conjoined sons with a sword and that some priests believed that the blood that had flowed between them signified wars between their progeny (confrontations did occur between Banu al'Abbas and Banu Ummaya ibn 'Abd Shams in the year 750 AH). The Muslim polymath Abū al-Rayhān al-Bīrūnī described conjoined twins in his book Kitab-al-Saidana.

The English twin sisters Mary and Eliza Chulkhurst, who were conjoined at the back (pygopagus), lived from 1100 to 1134 (or 1500 to 1534) and were perhaps the best-known early historical example of conjoined twins. Other early conjoined twins to attain notice were the "Scottish brothers", allegedly of the dicephalus type, essentially two heads sharing the same body (1460–1488, although the dates vary); the pygopagus Helen and Judith of Szőny, Hungary (1701–1723), who enjoyed a brief career in music before being sent to live in a convent; and Rita and Cristina of Parodi of Sardinia, born in 1829. Rita and Cristina were dicephalus tetrabrachius (one body with four arms) twins and although they died at only eight months of age, they gained much attention as a curiosity when their parents exhibited them in Paris.

Several sets of conjoined twins lived during the nineteenth century and made careers for themselves in the performing arts, though none achieved quite the same level of fame and fortune as Chang and Eng. Most notably, Millie and Christine McCoy (or McKoy), pygopagus twins, were born into slavery in North Carolina in 1851. They were sold to a showman, J.P. Smith, at birth, but were soon kidnapped by a rival showman. The kidnapper fled to England but was thwarted because England had already banned slavery. Smith traveled to England to collect the girls and brought with him their mother, Monimia, from whom they had been separated. He and his wife provided the twins with an education and taught them to speak five languages, play music, and sing. For the rest of the century, the twins enjoyed a successful career as "The Two-Headed Nightingale" and appeared with the Barnum Circus. In 1912, they died of tuberculosis, 17 hours apart.

Giacomo and Giovanni Tocci, from Locana, Italy, were immortalized in Mark Twain's short story "Those Extraordinary Twins" as fictitious twins Angelo and Luigi. The Toccis, born in 1877, were dicephalus tetrabrachius twins, having one body with two legs, two heads, and four arms. From birth they were forced by their parents to perform and never learned to walk, as each twin controlled one leg (in modern times, physical therapy allows twins like the Toccis to learn to walk on their own). They are said to have disliked show business. In 1886, after touring the United States, the twins returned to Europe with their family. They are believed to have died around this time, though some sources claim they survived until 1940, living in seclusion in Italy.

Notable people

Born 19th century and earlier

Mary and Eliza Chulkhurst, alleged names of the Biddenden Maids (per tradition, born in the 12th century) of Kent, England. They are the earliest set of conjoined twins whose names are (purportedly) known.
Lazarus and Joannes Baptista Colloredo (1617 — after 1646), autosite-and-parasite pair
Helen and Judith of Szony (Hungary, 1701 — 1723), pygopagus.
Chang and Eng Bunker (1811–1874). The Bunker twins were born of Chinese origin in Siam (now  Thailand), and the expression Siamese twins is derived from their case. They were joined by the areas around their xiphoid cartilages, but over time, the connective tissue stretched.
In 1834, a set of conjoined triplets were born in Cattania. Two of the heads shared a neck while the other head had its own. The infant, a male, was described by Galvagni.
Millie and Christine McCoy (July 11, 1851 – October 8, 1912), (oblique pygopagus). The McCoy twins were born into slavery in Columbus County, North Carolina, United States. They went by the stage names "The Two-Headed Nightingale" and "The Eighth Wonder of the World" and had an extensive career before retiring to the farm on which they were born.
Giacomo and Giovanni Battista Tocci (1875? — 1912?), (dicephalus tetrabrachius dipus)
Josefa and Rosa Blazek (January 20, 1878 — March 30, 1922), pygopagus. The Blazek twins were born in Skrejšov, Bohemia (now the Czech Republic). They began performing in public exhibitions at the age of 13, and their act later included Rosa's son Franz. The sisters died in Chicago, Illinois.

Born 20th century
Daisy and Violet Hilton of Brighton, England (1908–1969), pygopagus. The Hilton twins were performers who played musical instruments, sang, and danced. At the height of their career, they had the highest paid act in vaudeville. They also appeared in the movies Freaks and Chained for Life.
Lucio and Simplicio Godina of Samar, Philippines (1908–1936)
Masha and Dasha Krivoshlyapova of Moscow, Russia (1950–2003), the rarest form of conjoined twins, one of few cases of dicephalus tetrabrachius tripus (two heads, four arms, three legs)
Ronnie and Donnie Galyon of Ohio (1951–2020), omphalopagus; longest-lived conjoined twins in the world at 68 years and 250 days.
Tjitske and Folkje de Vries of Mûnein, Netherlands (b. 1953)
Wariboko and Tamunotonye Davies, born July 25, 1953, in Kano, Nigeria. Separated in London by a team led by Ian Aird. Tamunotonye died postoperatively. Wariboko became a nurse.
Lori and George Schappell, born September 18, 1961, in Reading, Pennsylvania, American entertainers, craniopagus.  As of 2022, they are the world's oldest living conjoined twins.
Ganga and Jamuna Mondal of India, born 1969 or 1970, known professionally as The Spider Girls and The Spider Sisters. Ischiopagus.
Anna and Barbara Rozycki (born 1970), the first conjoined twins successfully separated.
 Ma Nan Soe and Ma Nan San (born 1971 in Myanmar), separated in July 1971 at Yangon Pediatric Hospital. They were joined from chest to belly button. Ma Nan San died after one month and seven days after operation. 
Elisa and Lisa Hansen, Ogden, Utah (1977). Born by Caesarean section on October 18, 1977, were conjoined at the top of their head (craniopagus). They were separated 1979 after 16-hour surgery, were first to both survive surgery. Eliza lost the use of her right side after the surgery, but went on to complete school, win medals in the Special Olympics, work, and act in the theatre. Eliza died in 2020 (age 42).
Ladan and Laleh Bijani of Shiraz, Iran (1974–2003); died during separation surgery in Singapore. Craniopagus.
 Baby Girl A and Baby Girl B (born 1977 in New Jersey) shared a single six-chambered heart. Separation surgery, led by C. Everett Koop, involved the instant death of Baby Girl A; the difficult ethical and religious concerns generated significant local newspaper coverage. Baby Girl B survived for three months. 
Viet and Duc Nguyen, born on February 25, 1981, in Kon Tum Province, Vietnam, and separated in 1988 in Ho Chi Minh City. Viet died on October 6, 2007. Ischiopagus.
Maria and Consolata Mwakikuti of Tanzania (1986?–2018); conjoined by the abdomen; died of respiratory problems resulting from an abnormal, inoperable chest deformity.
Patrick and Benjamin Binder, separated in 1987 by team of doctors led by Ben Carson. Craniopagus.
Andrew and Alex Olson, born in 1987, separated in April 1988 at the University of Nebraska Medical Center. Omphalopagus. Alex died in 2018.
 Katie and Eilish Holton, born August 1988 in Ireland, separated at age 3 and a half. Katie died 4 days after the separation surgery due to a weak heart which went into cardiac arrest.
Abigail and Brittany Hensel are dicephalic parapagus twins born on March 7, 1990, in Carver County, Minnesota. Both graduated in 2012 from Bethel University, St. Paul, hired as teachers.
Tiesha and Iesha Turner (born 1991 in Texas), separated in 1992 at Texas Children's Hospital in Houston, Texas. Omphalopagus.
Ashley and Ashil Fokeer, born on November 2, 1992, in Mauritius
Joseph and Luka Banda (born January 23, 1997, in Zambia), separated in 1997 in South Africa by Ben Carson (with a later intervention in 2001 to artificially close their skulls). Craniopagus.
José Armando and José Luis Cevallos Herrera were born in September 1999 in Milagro, Ecuador. They were accepted in 2021 to the State University of Milagro.
Maria del Carmen Andrade Solis and Maria Guadalupe Andrade Solis (better known as Carmen and Lupita) were born in June 2000 in Veracruz, Mexico. They later moved to the United States for healthcare with their parents.

Born 21st century 

Carl and Clarence Aguirre, born with vertical craniopagus in Silay City, Negros Occidental, on April 21, 2002. They were successfully separated on August 4, 2004.
Tabea and Lea Block, from Lemgo, Germany, were born as craniopagus twins joined on the tops of their heads on August 9, 2003. The girls shared some major veins, but their brains were separate. They were separated on September 16, 2004, although Tabea died about 90 minutes later.
Sohna and Mohna from Amritsar, India. Born in New Delhi on June 14, 2003. They have two hearts, arms, kidneys and spinal cords while share liver, gall bladder and legs.
Anastasia and Tatiana Dogaru, born outside Rome in Lazio, Italy, on January 13, 2004. As craniopagus twins, the top of Tatiana's head is attached to the back of Anastasia's head.
Lakshmi Tatma (born 2005) was an ischiopagus conjoined twin born in Araria district in the state of Bihar, India. She had four arms and four legs, resulting from a joining at the pelvis with a headless undeveloped parasitic twin.
 In 2005 a set of conjoined triplets was detected, characterized as tricephalus, tetrabrachius, and tetrapus parapagothoracopagus, and the pregnancy interrupted at 22 weeks.
 Kendra and Maliyah Herrin, ischiopagus twins separated in 2006 at age 4
Krista and Tatiana Hogan, Canadian twins conjoined at the head. Born October 25, 2006. Share part of their brain and can pass sensory information and thoughts between each other.
Trishna and Krishna from Bangladesh were born in December 2006. They are craniopagus twins, joined on the tops of their skulls and sharing a small amount of brain tissue. In 2009, they were separated in Melbourne, Australia.
Maria and Teresa Tapia, born in the Dominican Republic on April 8, 2010. Conjoined by the liver, pancreas, and a small portion of their small intestine. Separation occurred on November 7, 2011, at Children's Hospital of Richmond at VCU.
 Aung Myat Kyaw and Aung Khant Kyaw (born in May 2011, Mandalay, Myanmar), connected at pelvis.
Jesus and Emanuel de Nazaré are dicephalic parapagus twins born in Pará, Brazil on December 19, 2011.
Zheng Han Wei and Zheng Han Jing, born in China on August 11, 2013. Conjoined by their sternum, pericardium, and liver. In 2014, they were separated in Shanghai, China, at the Shanghai Children's Medical Center.
Asa and Eli Hamby were born in 2014 in Georgia but died less than two days after birth due to heart failure. The twins were dicephalic parapagus  having two heads but being conjoined at the torso, arms and legs. They had separate spinal columns but one heart making postnatal operations impossible.
Jadon and Anias McDonald, born in September 2015. Conjoined by the head. Successfully separated at Children's Hospital of Montefiore Medical Center by James T. Goodrich in October 2016. 
Erin and Abby Delaney, born in Philadelphia, Pennsylvania on July 24, 2016. Conjoined by the head. They were successfully separated at Children's Hospital of Philadelphia on June 16, 2017.
Marieme and Ndeye Ndiaye, twin girls born in Senegal in 2017, living in Cardiff, UK in 2019.
Safa and Marwa Bibi, twin girls born in Hayatabad, Pakistan on January 17, 2017, conjoined by the head. Successfully separated at Great Ormond Street Hospital in February 2019.
Callie and Carter Torres, born January 30, 2017, in Houston Texas, from Blackfoot Idaho. They are Omphalo-Ischiopagus conjoined twins, attached by their pelvic area and sharing all organs from the belly button down with just one leg each.
Yiğit and Derman Evrensel, twin boys born on June 21, 2018, Antalya, Turkey. They are craniopagus twins and were separated at Great Ormond Street Hospital in 2019 by the same surgeons that separated Safa and Marwa Bibi.
Ervina and Prefina, born June 29, 2018, in the Central African Republic. They were separated on June 5, 2020, at the Bambino Gesù Pediatric Hospital in Rome, Italy.
Mercy and Goodness Ede, born August 13, 2019, conjoined by the chest and abdomen.  Successfully separated at the National Hospital in Abuja, Nigeria in November 2019.
Marie-Cléa and Marie-Cléanne Papillon, born in Mauritius in 2019. Conjoined from neck to abdomen, but also from heart which had seven rooms, instead of four. Marie-Cléa did not survive the surgery to separate the two.
Susannah and Elizabeth Castle, born April 22, 2021, and separated December 10, 2021, in Philadelphia, Pennsylvania.
AmieLynn Rose and JamieLynn Rae Finley, born October 3, 2022, and separated January 23, 2023, in Fort Worth, Texas.

In fiction
Conjoined twins have been the focus of several noteworthy works of entertainment, including:
 Stuck on You, a 2003 American comedy film screen written and directed by the Farrelly brothers and starring Matt Damon and Greg Kinnear as conjoined twin brothers, whose conflicting aspirations provide both conflict and humorous situations, in particular when one of them wishes to move to Hollywood to pursue a career as an actor.
 Alone, a Thai horror film following Pim after the death of her sister Ploy and their subsequent separation.
 Blood Sisters focuses on a French Canadian model who has a separated conjoined twin.
 CLAYMORE, Rafaela upon fuses with her sister Luciela, and subsequently awakening from of resembling the Twins Goddesses of Love.
 Tarot: Witch of the Black Rose graphic novel debut the ghost twin, She/they are constant companion(s) of Skeleton Man, her protector.
The Broadway musical Side Show depicts the lives of real-life conjoined twins Daisy and Violet Hilton, portrayed in the original Broadway production by Alice Ripley and Emily Skinner.
 Reiko the Zombie Shop, 1990s women's horror manga, bonus chapters focus on unexpectedly life of Noriko and her "sister". Summoners Dr. Zero can resurrect and control fuse zombies called medicinal death.
 MA GI & CA L., a conjoined magical alternative android, from psychology horror manga Magical Girl Apocalypse.
 In the TV series The Addams Family, there are extended family members of the Addams Family who are mentioned to have two heads. In "Mother Lurch Visits the Addams Family," Morticia Addams mentions that she has a Cousin Slimy who has two good heads on his shoulder. In "Progress and the Addams Family," Morticia was making a knitted hat for Cousin Plato where Gomez Addams has stated that his left head is size 6 and his right head is size 8 3/4. In "Lurch's Little Helper," Morticia made a portrait of Cousin Crimp who has a male head and a female head.
 Tamil actor Suriya portrays Vimalan and Akilan, conjoined twins in the 2012 film, Maattrraan.
 The book The Girls, by Canadian novelist Lori Lansens, published in 2005, is the fictional autobiography of Canadian craniopagus twins Rose and Ruby Darlen with Slovakian background.
 Irish author Sarah Crossan won the Carnegie Medal for her verse novel, One. The story follows the life and survival of conjoined twin sisters. The book also won The Bookseller 2016 prize for young adult fiction and the Irish Children's Book of the Year.
 In Lilo & Stitch: The Series, Swapper are Ischiopagus twin green stubby limbed lizard-like experiment with black eyes, purple markings on his back and three purple-tipped tendrils on each head that can emit a green ray from each head's eyes. The ray will swap the minds and voices of the targets,  and the only means of returning to normal is through Swapper choosing to do so. Because Swapper is two heads on the same body, Swapper is two beings cooperating as one, though their personalities mirror each other: they can be indecisive at times but usually work well together.
 In Big-Top Pee-wee, the Cabrini Circus has some conjoined twins named Ruth and Dot (portrayed by Helen Infield Siff and Carol Infield Sender).
 In The Addams Family and Addams Family Values, there are conjoined twins named Flora and Fauna Amor (portrayed by Darlene and Maureen Sue Levin) who were once dates to Gomez Addams and Uncle Fester. Both films also featured a two-headed relative named Dexter and Donald Addams (portrayed by Douglas Brian Martin and Steven M. Martin).
 In The Addams Family cartoon in 1992, the episode "N.J. Addams" featured Aunt Noggin who was a two-headed person who wears a Victorian dress. One head is black and speaks in a Jamaican accent and the other head is Caucasian and speaks in a Brooklyn accent. 
 In Midnighter issue #13, Shock & Awe is a superheroine working for Los Angeles Strike Force.
 Delilah and Jezebel in video games Bully.
 CatDog depicts Cat and Dog, a hybrid of a dog and cat who are brothers.
 On a LeapFrog Enterprises commercial advertising the Leapster from 2007, a boy is constantly playing video games from the console itself. The more he praises the Leapster, the more he grows extra heads.
 Zaphod Beeblebrox is a character from Douglas Adams' Hitchhiker's Guide to the Galaxy, who has a second head along with a third arm.
 Vaka-Waka and Nurp-Naut in Cartoon Network and The Lego Group's Mixels. 
 Fender and Bender (also known individually as HeadBanger) are characters in the 90's television series Toxic Crusaders, based on The Toxic Avenger films by Troma Entertainment. Fender is supposed to be a Mad Scientist while Bender is a Surfer. 
 Dragon Tales, a children's show, depicts Zak and Wheezie (voiced by Jason Michas and Kathleen Barr) as a two-headed dragon that are brother and sister making them dicephalic parapagus twins.
 In the Canadian mobile game My Singing Monsters, a bird-like species known as the Quibble is made up of elements Air and Water. The two-headed species plays a piano and has different colored feathers on both heads. 
The Simpsons features Hugo in "Treehouse of Horror VII", who is Bart Simpson's conjoined twin. They were separated at birth by Dr. Hibbert and Hugo was imprisoned in the Simpsons' attic. 
The Oblongs, depicts  Biff Oblong (Randy Sklar) and Chip Oblong (Jason Sklar)—17-year-old conjoined twins who are attached at the waist and share a middle leg due to their valley's pollution and radiation.
 In the DC Comics series Hitman, villain Moe and Joe Dubelz is a conjoined twin gangster. Moe was alive at the time of introduction, but Joe had already died and is, in fact, undergoing putrefaction.
 In the episode "Humbug" of The X-Files, Vincent Schiavelli portrayed a circus performer named Lanny, with an underdeveloped conjoined twin named Leonard. The episode also includes a reference to Chang and Eng.
 The Prophet of Yonwood has a reference to Chang and Eng when the main character, Nickie, finds a picture of them in her great-grandfather's old house in Siam.
 In the anime Naruto, Sakon (左近) and his conjoined twin brother Ukon (右近) are the strongest of the Sound Four and count as one member due to their abilities to merge bodies and kill an opponent at a cellular level. They both serve as antagonists.
 The American medical drama Grey's Anatomy featured several cases of conjoined twins.
 The 2001 movie Not Another Teen Movie depicts Kara and Sara Fratelli, conjoined twins portrayed by Samaire Armstrong and Nectar Rose.
 The musical group Evelyn, Evelyn depicts a pair of conjoined twin sisters—often referred to as "The Evelyn Sisters"—in many of their songs and music videos. The fictional sisters are shown to be child prostitutes in the music video for "Sandy Fishnets", and the song "Evelyn, Evelyn" describes their longing for privacy and to be separated from one another.
 The Bride with White Hair, a 1993 Hong Kong movie, features conjoined twin villains.
 The animated series Duckman featured Eric T. Duckman's sons Charles (voiced by Dana Hill in 1994–1996, Pat Musick in 1997) and Mambo (voiced by E. G. Daily) who are dicephalic parapagus twins where their heads share a body.
 Fran Bow, a 2015 indie psychological horror game, includes Clara and Mia Buhalmet, a set of mentally ill conjoined twins, as characters. They were surgically sewn together, much like an experiment performed by Josef Mengele, also known as the Angel of Death, in which a pair of twins were sewn together back to back by blood vessels and organs, in an attempt to create conjoined twins.
 The Peach Tree, a Korean novel and film, portrays conjoined twin brothers falling in love with the same woman. 
 The 1999 movie Twin Falls Idaho portrays conjoined twin brothers who are played by two non-conjoined identical twin brothers, one of whom directed the film, and both of whom co-wrote the screenplay. 
 In the fourth season of the American television series American Horror Story titled American Horror Story: Freak Show, the main character Bette and Dot Tattler (Sarah Paulson in a dual role) are a dicephalic parapagus twin where their two heads are side by side on one torso. This performance is done with the help of CGI.
 In season two, episode eight of Rick and Morty, Michael and Pichael Thompson (voiced by Justin Roiland) are depicted as conjoined twins hosting separate TV shows at the same time. 
 In the Cirque Du Soleil show Kurios: Cabinetes des Curiosities, a pair of conjoined twins are among the Seeker's collection. They later split during an aerial straps duo and reunite for the rest of the show. 
 The bilingual film Chaarulatha stars Priyamani as a conjoined twin.
 In the Disney-distributed movie Jagga Jasoos, starring Ranbir Kapoor and Katrina Kaif, Basheer Alexander is shown with two heads.
 On the television series Ruby Gloom, the characters Frank and Len are conjoined twins who comprise a rock group called RIP.
 In the film Monsters University, two of the members of the fictitious fraternity Oozma Kappa are named Terri and Terry Perry (voiced by Sean Hayes and Dave Foley). They are dicephalic parapagus twins where they have four arms and share the same tentacles that are in place of their legs. 
 In the children's cartoon Steven Universe, the Rutile twins are conjoined.
 Fire and Water are conjoined twins in Chris Abani's 2014 novel The Secret History of Las Vegas.
 The Knick portrays conjoined twins Zoya and Nika, who share a liver. They are successfully separated by the doctors.
 Brian Aldiss's 1977 novel Brothers of the Head depicts conjoined twins who become rock stars.  In the 2005 film version, they are played by non-conjoined identical twins Harry Treadaway and Luke Treadaway.
 The 2006 remake of The Hills Have Eyes briefly shows a photo of a set of twins, who have Cephalothoracopagus/Janiceps. This particular case, was caused by Agent Orange.
Admirals Watson and Crick are presumably conjoined twins joined at the torso in the 2015 children's show Miles from Tomorrowland.
 In the Ultimate Marvel reality of Marvel Comics, Syndicate is two conjoined twins in Ultimate X-Men. They were created by Brian K. Vaughn and Steve Dillon, and first appeared in Ultimate X-Men #58. They were killed during the crossover event Ultimatum.
 In the horror video game Dead by Daylight, the playable characters "The Twins" are a brother and sister who are conjoined twins. However, the brother is able to detach from the sister.
 In the episode 11 and 12 of the first season of The Good Doctor, Marcus Andrew and Neil Melandez's accomplish a kidney transplant on a pair of conjoined twins, the operation leads to several complications and multiple operations to try saving the girls.
 In the 1982 film Basket Case and its sequels, Duane and Belial Bradley were separated after their father's death and Belial is hidden in the basket.
 The horror comedy Conjoined features conjoined twins, one of whom is a serial killer.

See also
 Medical law
 Monoamniotic twins
 Polycephaly

Notes

References

External links

 Types and social history of conjoined twins
 The site of the medical Saudi team responsible for numerous successful separation surgeries
 Eng and Chang – The Original Siamese Twins; The University of North Carolina at Chapel Hill, The North Carolina Collection Gallery
 The Human Marvels: A Historical Reference Site run by J. Tithonus Pednaud, Teratological Historian
 Cases of conjoined and incomplete twins 
 Clara and Alta Rodriguez, joined at the pelvis and successfully separated in 1974 at Children's Hospital of Philadelphia by surgeons including C. Everett Koop
 National Library of Medicine: Selected Moments in the History of Conjoined Twins
 Conjoined Twins Fast Facts (also lists additional twins) 
 Emedicine article (this article includes post-mortem images)
 Facts About Multiples: Conjoined Records and stats
"The St. Benoit Twins", Scientific American, July 13, 1878, p. 24

 
Rare diseases